Bonshaw may refer to:

Australia 

Bonshaw, New South Wales, a town
Bonshaw, Queensland, a locality in the Goodiwindi Region
Bonshaw, Victoria a suburb of Ballarat

Canada 

Bonshaw, Prince Edward Island, a town on Prince Edward Island, Canada

United Kingdom 

Barony of Bonshaw in North Ayrshire, Scotland
Bonshaw Tower